Jan Håkan Åberg (10 March 1916 – 8 January 2012) was a Swedish organist and composer.

Born in Dalarna, Åberg worked as a cathedral organist in Härnösand. He is represented in the current Swedish Book of Psalms (1986) with two songs: In dulci jubilo and Så älskade Gud världen all.

References

1916 births
2012 deaths
20th-century Swedish male musicians
20th-century Swedish musicians
Male classical organists
Swedish classical composers
Swedish classical organists
Swedish male classical composers